Happiness Ltd. is the third studio album, and second major release since signing with Sire Records by Hot Hot Heat. The album was released on September 11, 2007. It is their first album without original member Dante DeCaro.

Track listing

In media
 The song "5 Times Out of 100" originally appeared on Hot Hot Heat's earlier release, Knock Knock Knock.
 The album was also released as a Deluxe Limited Edition with a bonus DVD containing the fifty-minute "Harmonicas and Tambourines" making-of documentary.
 The track "My Best Fiend" was included on the MLB 08: The Show soundtrack, in which you are able to listen to it while browsing the main menu.
 The track "Give Up?" is included on the PlayStation 2 and PlayStation Portable video game Burnout Dominator, it is also featured in the movie Sex Drive.
 The track "Let Me In" was included on the video game Saints Row 2's in-game radio.

Notes

External links
 Official Site
 
 Hot Hot Heat Myspace

Hot Hot Heat albums
2007 albums
Sire Records albums